The R366 road is a regional road in Ireland linking R362 regional road to the N63 national secondary road in Roscommon Town. It passes through the hamlets of Castlecoote and Fuerty en route.

See also
Roads in Ireland
National primary road
National secondary road

References
Roads Act 1993 (Classification of Regional Roads) Order 2006 – Department of Transport

Regional roads in the Republic of Ireland
Roads in County Roscommon